Evelyn Achille de Rothschild (6 January 1886 – 17 November 1917) was a British banker and soldier. Born in London, England, he was the second of three sons of Leopold de Rothschild (1845–1917) and Marie Perugia (1862–1937) and a part of the prominent Rothschild banking family of England.

Early life and education
de Rothschild was educated at Trinity College, Cambridge, where he was a member of the University Pitt Club and earned a B.A.

Career

British Army career
Born into wealth and privilege, Evelyn de Rothschild was expected to play a major role with the N M Rothschild & Sons bank. However, at the outbreak of World War I he and brother Anthony joined the British Army. In November 1915, while serving with the Royal Buckinghamshire Yeomanry on the Gallipoli front, Evelyn de Rothschild was wounded and sent home to recuperate.

Within a few months, de Rothschild was back at the Front where in March 1916 his service resulted in his being mentioned in dispatches. Sent to fight in Palestine, he was critically wounded during the 13 November Battle of Mughar Ridge against the Turkish Seventh Army and died four days later. On 5 December 1920, his brother, Captain Anthony de Rothschild, unveiled the War Memorial in the churchyard of All Saints Church at Wing, Buckinghamshire honoring Evelyn and his other comrades from Wing who were killed in the war.

References

 See also the list of references at: Rothschild banking family of England

Alumni of Trinity College, Cambridge
English bankers
English Jews
Evelyn Achille de Rothschild
British Army personnel of World War I
British military personnel killed in World War I
1886 births
1917 deaths
Royal Buckinghamshire Yeomanry officers
20th-century English businesspeople